Great Northern may refer to:

Transport 
 One of a number of railways; see Great Northern Railway (disambiguation).
 Great Northern Railway (U.S.), a defunct American transcontinental railroad and major predecessor of the BNSF Railway. 
 Great Northern Railway (Great Britain), a defunct British railway company formed in 1846, namesake of:
 Great Northern Route, a group of railway services in the South-East and East of England, UK
 Thameslink, Southern and Great Northern, a franchise for the provision of this route
 Govia Thameslink Railway (formerly Thameslink and Great Northern), the company currently operating this franchise
GNR Class A1 1470 Great Northern, a British steam locomotive of the Great Northern Railway and the London and North Eastern Railway.

Other 
Great Northern bean, a white common bean
 Great Northern Brewing Co., an Australian beer manufacturer
 Great Northern (country band), led by former Mission Mountain Wood Band member Rob Quist
 Great northern diver (Gavia immer), a bird also known as the common loon
 Great Northern Elevator, a historic grain elevator in Buffalo, New York
 Great Northern (indie band), led by former 30 Seconds to Mars member Solon Bixler
 Great Northern War, a war fought by Russia, Denmark-Norway, and Saxony-Poland against Sweden
 Great Northern Warehouse, a leisure complex in Manchester, England
 Great Northern Paper Company, a Maine pulp and paper manufacturer
 Great Northern?, a 1947 novel by Arthur Ransome in the Swallows and Amazons series, named after the diver
 USS Great Northern (AG-9), a cargo ship of the US Navy